Zoe Davis is a fictional character from the Australia soap opera Neighbours, portrayed by Ally Fowler. She made her first screen appearance during the episode broadcast on 20 January 1986.

Creation and casting
After Neighbours was picked up by Network Ten, producers decided to improve the show by adding several new and older cast members. Shortly after, Ally Fowler won the role of Zoe. The actress was approached by the Grundy Organisation, following her appearance as Angela Hamilton in Sons and Daughters. Fowler was concerned that soap opera can typecast an actor and revealed that she did not want to get tied to Neighbours for as long as she was with Sons and Daughters.

In May 1986, Fowler announced that she would be leaving Neighbours. She chose not to extend her contract with the show after June. Fowler's character remained on-screen until September. Patrice Fidgeon from TV Week reported that Zoe would then be rested in case Fowler wanted to return to the show in the future.

Development
Zoe was described by James Oram, author of Neighbours: Behind the scenes, as being "fickle and unpredictable to an incredible degree", she has a sharp wit and is also blunt, but not heartless. Josephine Monroe, who wrote The Neighbours Programme Guide, noted that Zoe was both "charming and infuriating". She had a "devil-may-care" attitude towards finances, trouble and inconvenience. Zoe also had many careers, including; singer, dancer, saleswoman and waitress. Monroe commented that Zoe took her jobs seriously, but could not choose between them. Zoe was an old school friend of Daphne Lawrence (Elaine Smith) and she came to Erinsborough for her wedding to Des Clarke (Paul Keane). A writer for the BBC called Zoe and Daphne's relationship "stormy". When Des and Daphne went on their honeymoon, Zoe house sat for them and set about "sinking her claws into Ramsay Street."

According to Oram, "romance is the only game she really likes to play and this she pursues most of all, but not always wisely." Zoe longed to be "truly in love", but it often eluded her. Zoe developed a relationship with Jim Robinson (Alan Dale), which shocked the other Ramsay Street residents as Zoe was much younger than Jim. The couple also had very different personalities. Dale believed that there was nothing wrong with an older man being involved with a younger woman. Zoe and Jim's relationship did not sit well with Jim's family and his youngest child, Lucy (Kylie Flinker), was especially unhappy about it. Jim's son, Paul (Stefan Dennis), made things difficult for Zoe, but she was unaware that he actually liked her. Jim proposed to Zoe and she later discovered she was pregnant. Jim was "reluctant" to become a father again and he and Zoe grew distant, as she wanted the baby. However, Zoe collapsed at home one day after suffering an ectopic pregnancy and she was left "heartbroken" when she miscarried the baby. She and Jim then split up. Paul almost confessed his feelings to Zoe, but they were interrupted by the arrival of Zoe's ex-boyfriend, Tony Chapman (Peter Bensley). Tony offered Zoe a job and proposed to her. They then left Erinsborough together.

Storylines
Zoe suddenly arrives in Erinsborough to see Daphne Lawrence, who she had not spoken to in years. She chats up Shane Ramsay (Peter O'Brien), Mike Young (Guy Pearce) and later Jim Robinson. When Zoe learns that Daphne is to marry Des Clarke, she convinces them to let her move in until after the wedding. Zoe's behaviour annoys Max Ramsay (Francis Bell), Paul and Clive Gibbons (Geoff Paine). Daphne reluctantly gives her a trial at the Coffee Shop, but she loses the job after buying too much champagne for an office party. Zoe later temps at the Daniels Corporation until Sue Wright (Gael Ballentyne) is promised the job, but Sue is not good enough and Zoe gets the job on a permanent basis. Des's ex-girlfriend, Andrea Townsend (Gina Gaigalas), and her son, Bradley (Bradley Kilpatrick), arrive and Zoe begins to feel jealous. She is also concerned about being frozen out of a relationship with Des.

Zoe begins dating Jim and Paul fears Zoe is out for his father's money. Jim's daughter, Lucy also dislikes Zoe and she is constantly rude to her. She pours a jug of water over Zoe and begins making nuisance calls. On one occasion, Zoe fetches a whistle and blows it down the phone. This leaves Lucy with a burst eardrum and she gives up. Her behaviour towards Zoe then begins to mellow. Des gives Zoe some counselling over her scratchcard addiction and warns her about going over the limit on her credit card. Zoe's addiction also concerns Paul. Zoe models for an advertising poster for the Coffee Shop to earn some extra money.

After a short stay at a guest-house in the mountains, Zoe returns to Ramsay Street and is much more mature. She pretends to be seriously ill, but Clive is not fooled, until Zoe suddenly feels a sharp pain in her stomach and collapses. She suffers an ectopic pregnancy and miscarries Jim's child. Zoe runs into her ex-boyfriend, Tony Chapman, and they rekindle their relationship. Tony asks Zoe to come and work for him, but she tells him that she cannot leave the Daniels Corporation. Paul falls for Zoe, but after a jealous outburst from him, Zoe leaves to work for Tony. Tony proposes to Zoe and she admits that she may not be able to have children. However, Tony wants to be with Zoe regardless of her situation and they get engaged. Zoe leaves Ramsay Street to move in with Tony. Zoe comes back to see Daphne when she is admitted to the hospital with meningitis. Zoe helps Susan Cole (Gloria Ajenstat) with her son, Sam (Thomas Hamston), while Susan goes for a job interview. Des learns that Zoe has taken out a second credit card and has gone over the limit, so he writes her a financial plan and forces her to cut up her cards. Zoe announces that Tony needs her to return to work for him and she leaves.

Reception
A writer for the BBC's Neighbours website said Zoe's most notable moment was "Causing Lucy to become temporarily deaf." Monroe stated "Zoe was one of the wildest and most unconventional women Erinsborough ever knew." Fergus Shiel from The Sydney Morning Herald called Zoe a "saucy secretary."

References

External links
 Character profile at the BBC
 Character profile at Neighbours.com

Neighbours characters
Fictional models
Television characters introduced in 1986
Female characters in television